David Ochoa (born January 16, 2001) is a professional footballer who plays as a goalkeeper for Liga MX club Atlético San Luis. Born in the United States, he has represented both the Mexico national under-21 team and U.S. national youth teams.

Early life
Born in California to Mexican parents, Ochoa was introduced to the sport at a young age by his father, who also played as a goalkeeper. He played youth soccer with AC Brea, gaining national attention at the 2015 Dallas Cup youth tournament, where he helped his team win the U14 tournament. He drew attention from Mexican clubs Guadalajara and Monterrey and American clubs LA Galaxy and Real Salt Lake.

In April 2015, he earned his first US youth team call-up to play for the United States U14 team. He joined the Guadalajara youth academy,  but was unable to play in competitive matches due to Mexican regulations requiring his parents to be present since he was a minor. During his time in Mexico, Ochoa also trained with the Mexico U16 team. Afterwards, he returned to the USA, joining the Real Salt Lake Academy.

Club career
Ochoa appeared for USL side Real Monarchs on April 22, 2018 in a 2–0 loss to Tampa Bay Rowdies, becoming the second-youngest goalkeeper ever to debut in USL. 

On August 8, 2018, it was reported that Ochoa was training with Manchester United and had further trials planned with clubs from Spain and Germany.

Ochoa signed with Real Salt Lake on November 28, 2018, ahead of the 2019 season. Ochoa was loaned to the Real Monarchs for his first season and won the USL Championship, defeating Louisville City FC on November 17, 2019 in Louisville, KY. In 2019, he played in the MLS Homegrown game at the 2019 MLS All-Star Game.

Ochoa made his Real Salt Lake debut on November 8, 2020 against Sporting Kansas City.

Ochoa was fined for kicking the ball into the stands during an April 24, 2021 match against Minnesota United FC. He recorded his first Major League Soccer shutout on May 15, 2021 against Nashville SC.

International career

United States
Ochoa was eligible to play for the United States or Mexico. Originally called up to the Mexico under-16s, Ochoa instead opted to play for the United States at multiple youth levels. 

Ochoa has been capped at under-16, −18, and −20 levels for the U.S. and has also been a member of the under-17 residency program. On August 25, 2018, Ochoa made multiple penalty saves in the final of the 2018 Vaclav Jezek Tournament in helping the U.S. under-18s to winning the tournament.

On December 1, 2020, Ochoa was called up to the United States senior team by head coach Gregg Berhalter for the friendly against El Salvador on December 9, but was replaced by San Jose Earthquakes goalkeeper JT Marcinkowski after Ochoa was diagnosed with a right quad strain.

Ochoa was named to the final 20-player United States under-23 roster for the 2020 CONCACAF Men's Olympic Qualifying Championship in March 2021. Ochoa started three games for the under-23 team during Olympic qualification. The United States failed to qualify for the 2020 Olympics after losing 2–1 to Honduras; Honduras scored their second goal after Ochoa played an errant pass that ricocheted off Luis Palma and into the United States goal.

On May 24, 2021, Ochoa was named to the United States' roster for the 2021 CONCACAF Nations League Finals.

Mexico
On August 2, 2021, Fox Sports reported that Ochoa had submitted and filed a one-time switch with FIFA in order to make a full move to the Mexico national football team.

On October 9, 2021, Ochoa made his Mexico U21 debut in a friendly match against the Romania U21 side.

On April 21, 2022, Ochoa received his first call-up to the senior national team by manager Gerardo Martino for a friendly match against Guatemala.

Career statistics

Club

Honours
Real Monarchs
USL Cup: 2019

United States U20
CONCACAF U-20 Championship: 2018

United States
CONCACAF Nations League: 2019–20

References

External links
 

2001 births
Living people
American sportspeople of Mexican descent
American soccer players
Mexican footballers
Soccer players from California
Sportspeople from Oxnard, California
Association football goalkeepers
C.D. Guadalajara footballers
Homegrown Players (MLS)
Real Monarchs players
Real Salt Lake players
D.C. United players
Atlético San Luis footballers
Major League Soccer players
USL Championship players
MLS Next Pro players
United States men's youth international soccer players
United States men's under-20 international soccer players
United States men's under-23 international soccer players
Mexico youth international footballers